Cara Black and Liezel Huber were the defending champions after defeating  Natalie Grandin and Laura Granville in the 2010 final. However they did not defend the title together after splitting halfway through the 2010 season.
Květa Peschke and Katarina Srebotnik won in the final against Sofia Arvidsson and Marina Erakovic, 6–3, 6–0.

Seeds

Draw

Draw

References

 Doubles Draw

WTA Auckland Open
2011 WTA Tour